Mihai Tänzer (7 February 1905 – 22 September 1993) was a Romanian footballer of Danube Swabian (German) ethnicity, he also had Hungarian citizenship when he played in Hungary.

Club career
In the early 1920s, Timișoara "Chinezul" dominated the Romanian football scene, even winning against important teams from the rest of Europe. Mihai Tänzer made his first senior appearance, at the age of 16, on the first team of the club, which already had 83 players. He soon found his place among the stalwarts as Ritter, Hoksary, Steiner, Wetzer, Semler and Vogl. A midfielder, in a few years he became one of the best European players in this position.

Chinezul was among the top teams of that time, alongside Juventus Bucharest, Venus Bucharest, CAO Oradea, Rapid Bucharest, C.A.T. Timișoara and AMEF Arad. During 1922–1927, "Chinezul", with Tänzer on the team, brought six consecutive national titles to Timișoara.

At the end of 1929, he arrived at Ferencváros, the most popular Hungarian club at that time, and was known there as Táncos Mihály. He played there for over a decade, winning three national titles, two cups, and one Mitropa Cup as well. At the 1938 Mitropa Cup, he faced Ripensia, another powerhouse team from Timișoara, which in the late 1930s won four national titles in Romania. Tänzer scored a goal against them in the last minutes, bringing Ferencváros a close 5–4 victory. After a year he went to play for Ripensia Timișoara, finishing his club career, and later ended up coaching them.

International career
Tänzer made his debut for Romania on 2 September 1923 in a match against Poland ended 1–1. He represented his country at the 1924 Summer Olympics in Paris, he got 10 caps for Romania between 1923 and 1929 and scored once.
In 1929, he went to play for neighbouring Hungary as "Táncos Mihály", and earned five caps scoring a goal.

Never giving up his Romanian citizenship, afterwards Táncos became Tänzer once again, returning to Romania and living the rest of his life in Cluj.

Honours
Chinezul Timișoara
Liga I: 6
1922, 1923, 1924, 1925, 1926, 1927

Ferencváros TC
Hungarian League: 3
1932, 1934, 1938
Magyar Kupa: 2
1933, 1935
Mitropa Cup: 1
1937

References

External links
 Mihai Tänzer at RSSSF
 Mihai Tänzer at Sports Reference

1905 births
1993 deaths
Sportspeople from Timișoara
Danube-Swabian people
Romanian footballers
Romania international footballers
Hungarian footballers
Hungary international footballers
Footballers at the 1924 Summer Olympics
Olympic footballers of Romania
Ferencvárosi TC footballers
FC Ripensia Timișoara players
Dual internationalists (football)
Liga I players
Nemzeti Bajnokság I players
Romanian people of German descent
Hungarian people of German descent
Association football midfielders